Antonio Quintanilla (Pámanes, Spain; 1787 - † Almería, Spain; 1863)  was a Spanish brigadier and Governor of Chiloé from 1820 to 1826. He was the last royalist to hold the position.

Background 
Quintanilla was the son of Francisco de Quintanilla and Teresa Herrera y Santiago, who were members of distinguished families in the Spanish region of Pámanes. He was born November 14, 1787.

He married Antonia Álvarez de Garay, the daughter of Captain Francisco alvarez and Bartola Garay.

Governor of Chiloé 
As a governor of Chiloé, Quintanilla ordered in 1824 the construction of Fuerte Real de San Carlos. He is also noted for defeating General Ramón Freire's first attempt to liberate Chiloé in 1825 after he dissolved the Chilean congress by force. By January 1826, Quintanilla finally surrendered and became the last Spanish official to withdraw from Chile. He came back to Spain and served as a brigadier of the Santander barracks then the deputy general of La Mancha police.

Quintanilla was the father of Antonio de Quintanilla Alvarez, a Spanish official given the Carlist title of Marquis de Quintanilla.

References

1787 births
1863 deaths
People from Trasmiera
Royal Governors of Chiloé
Spanish military personnel of the Chilean War of Independence
Royalists in the Hispanic American Revolution